The following is a timeline of the history of the city of Maribor, Slovenia.

Prior to 19th century

 1164 – First mention of Maribor as a castle on Pyramid Hill.
 1204 – Maribor mentioned as a square.
 1248 – First mention of the Maribor Cathedral.
 1254 – Maribor mentioned as a town.
 1478 – A second castle is built in the northeastern corner of town.
 1515 – Maribor Town Hall is built.
 1532 – The Siege of Maribor.
 1752 – Maribor becomes the seat of the county.
 1758 – The first gymnasium is established.
 1795 – The first printing house is established.

19th century

 1846 – The Southern Railway is constructed through the town.
 1859 – Bishop Anton Martin Slomšek transfers the seat of the Diocese of Lavant to Maribor.
 1863 – Maribor is connected with Carinthia, with the construction of the Carinthian Railway.
 1868 – The first daily Slovenian newspaper, called Slovenski narod is established. 
 1883 – The first electric light in Slovene ethnic territory is installed on Castle Square.
 1899 – Maribor National Hall is built.

20th century

 1913 – The Old Bridge is built.
 1918 – Rudolf Maister secures the city for the State of Slovenes, Croats and Serbs.
 1919 – I. SSK Maribor is established.

 1922 – Maribor becomes the seat of the Maribor Oblast.
 1927 – Letalski center Maribor founded.
 1941
 Nazi Germany occupies Maribor.
 First action against the occupier in Maribor and Slovenia.
 Stalag XVIII-D prisoner-of-war camp for Allied POWs established by the Germans.
 Forced labour camp established by the Germans.
 1941–1945 – Maribor prison massacres.
 1942
 August: Subcamp of the Stalag XVIII-B POW camp for Allied POWs established by the Germans.
 November: Subcamp of the Stalag XVIII-B POW camp dissolved.
 1945 – Maribor liberated.
 1960 – NK Maribor is established.
 1962 – Roman Catholic Diocese of Maribor established.
 1964 – First Women FIS Alpine Ski World Cup held on Pohorje.
 1975 – University of Maribor established.
 1991
 First clash between the Yugoslav People's Army and the Slovenian Territorial Defence occurs in Pekre and Maribor.
 Maribor becomes part of independent Slovenia.
 1997 – NK Maribor wins its first Slovenian football championship.

21st century
 2002 – Maribor hosts the 2002 European Judo Championships.
 2004 – Slovenia becomes part of the European Union.
 2006 – Diocese of Maribor promoted to Archdiocese.
 2007 – Maribor University Medical Centre opened.
 2009 – Maribor hosts the 2009 World Shotgun Championships.
 2012
 The 2012-2013 Maribor protests begin, which spread into the 2012-2013 Slovenian protests.
 Maribor becomes the European Capital of Culture.
 2013 – Maribor becomes the European Youth Capital.
 2015 – Maribor hosts the 2015 European Shooting Championships.

See also
 Maribor history
 Timeline of Slovenian history

References

History of Maribor
Maribor